The ‎Battle of er Rias‎ took place in 1329, ‎‎in er-Rias near a town named Mermadjenna in the land of the Hawwars. It was fought between the troops of the Hafsid caliph, Abu Yahya Abu Bakr, and the army of the Zayanid sultan, Abu Tashfîn, commanded by Yahya Ibn Moussa, Omar Ibn Hamza (leader of the nomadic tribes of‎‎ Ifriqiya)‎‎ as well as the Hafsid‎‎‎‎ prince Mohamed Ibn Abu Umran, who had been the governor of Tripoli. The prince was declared caliph of the Hafsids and the army marched east.

Battle 
After having had time to prepare his soldiers, Abu Yahya Abu Bakr set out to intercept Abu‎‎ Tashfîn's ‎‎army. The two armies faced each other in er-Rias in the land of the Hawwars. Abu Tashfîn's army feinted a retreat to lure the Hafsid army into mountainous terrain, where they could take advantage of their position. Arab‎‎ contingents of the Hafsid army joined the Ziyanids, contributing to their victory.

Consequences 
In the course of the battle, the Hafsid sultan was wounded, and the women of his family and his two sons, Ahmed and Omar, fell into the hands of the Ziyanids and were sent to Tlemcen.‎‎ Abu Yahya took refuge in Constantine,‎ or Annaba. Following this victory, the Ziyands marched on Tunis and ‎‎occupied it.

See also 

 Siege of Béjaïa (1326-1329)
 Battle of Temzezdekt
 Capture of Tunis (1329)

References 

Conflicts in 1329
14th century in Ifriqiya